This is the discography of C-Murder, an American rapper; consists of seven studio albums, nine singles, Music videos, one mixtape, one collaboration album and guest appearances are also included. He also the founder of the Vanity label TRU Records.

Albums

Studio albums

Collaboration albums

Soundtrack albums

Mixtapes

Compilation albums

Singles

As lead artist

As featured artist

References

Hip hop discographies
Discographies of American artists